Christopher Barry Wood (born November 25, 1969) is an American bassist with the jazz trio Medeski Martin & Wood and The Wood Brothers.

Biography
Wood was raised in Boulder, Colorado, where he studied jazz and classical music. He attended the New England Conservatory of Music in 1989. His teachers included Geri Allen, Dave Holland, and Bob Moses. Reducing his classes, he accompanied Moses and John Medeski as sidemen for a tour, then played with them in New York City.

He formed Medeski Martin & Wood in 1991 with Medeski and Billy Martin. Wood also collaborates with his brother, Oliver Wood in the band The Wood Brothers. Medeski produced their debut album, Ways Not to Lose. He has worked with Marc Ribot, Ned Rothenberg, John Scofield, Elliott Sharp, and John Zorn.

References 

American jazz double-bassists
Male double-bassists
American jazz bass guitarists
American male bass guitarists
Living people
21st-century double-bassists
21st-century American male musicians
American male jazz musicians
Medeski Martin & Wood members
1969 births